The following is a list of mayors of Caledon, Ontario.

References

External links
 Mayor of Caledon

Caledon
Mayors